Edge Hill Intercity Depot is a traction maintenance depot located in Edge Hill, Merseyside, England. The depot is situated at the junction of the Liverpool to Manchester Line and the Crewe to Liverpool Line, and is located to the east of Edge Hill station. The depot is built on the site of the former Cheshire Lines Committee Wavertree and Edge Hill goods station.

The depot code is LL.

Allocation 
As of 2023, the depot's allocation consists of TransPennine Express British Rail Class 802 and Avanti West Coast Class 390 Pendolinos.

References

Railway depots in England
Rail transport in Merseyside